Robert McClelland (August 1, 1807 – August 30, 1880) was a US statesman, serving as U.S. Representative from Michigan, the ninth governor of Michigan, and United States Secretary of the Interior.

Early life in Pennsylvania
He was born in Greencastle, Pennsylvania, the son of a prominent Franklin County doctor. He entered Dickinson College at Carlisle, Pennsylvania, and graduated among the top of his class in 1829. He studied law and was admitted to the Pennsylvania bar in 1831 and practiced law in Pittsburgh for a short time before moving in 1833 to Monroe in what was then the Territory of Michigan.

Life and politics in Michigan
McClelland became a member of the Michigan bar and established a successful law practice in Monroe, and he was a member of the constitutional convention in 1835. After Michigan became a state, Governor Stevens T. Mason offered the positions of state Bank Commissioner and state Attorney General, both of which he declined in order to develop his private practice, although he maintained an active role in the new state's Democratic Party. In 1836, McClelland married Sarah Elizabeth Sabine, with whom he had six children.

McClelland served on the board of regents of the University of Michigan in 1837 and again in 1850. He represented Monroe County in the Michigan House of Representatives in 1838, 1840 and was speaker of the house in 1843. He served as the mayor of Monroe in 1841. He was elected in 1842 as U.S. Representative from Michigan's 1st congressional district, serving from 1843 to 1849 in the 28th, 29th, and 30th congresses. Going against the general opinion of the Democratic Party, he was a strong advocate of the Wilmot Proviso, which would have restricted the spread of slavery to new states. He was active in supporting his friend Lewis Cass's unsuccessful run for president in 1848 and did not seek reelection in that year.

McClelland played a prominent role in the Michigan's constitutional convention of 1850. Due to changes adopted in that constitution, he was elected to a one-year term as Governor of Michigan in 1851. He was re-elected to a full two-year term in 1852. During his tenure, he softened his support of the Wilmot Proviso and instead urged support for the Compromise of 1850. He played a prominent role at the national Democratic convention of 1852. He resigned as governor in March 1853 to become the Secretary of the Interior under Franklin Pierce, and was succeeded by his second Lieutenant Governor Andrew Parsons.

Retirement and death
Following the inauguration of James Buchanan in 1857, McClelland retired from public office and began a private law practice in Detroit. In 1867, he briefly returned to public service as a member of the Michigan constitutional convention.

McClelland died in Detroit at the age of 73, and is interred at Elmwood Cemetery. 

His former residence at 47 East Elm Avenue in Monroe, Michigan, was listed on the National Register of Historic Places in 1971 as the Governor Robert McClelland House, and is today privately owned.

References

External links
Robert McClelland entry at the National Governors Association
Robert McClelland entry at The Political Graveyard

|-

|-

|-

|-

1807 births
1880 deaths
People from Franklin County, Pennsylvania
American people of Scotch-Irish descent
United States Secretaries of the Interior
Pierce administration cabinet members
Buchanan administration cabinet members
Democratic Party members of the United States House of Representatives from Michigan
Democratic Party governors of Michigan
Speakers of the Michigan House of Representatives
People from Monroe, Michigan
19th-century American politicians
Dickinson College alumni
Regents of the University of Michigan
Burials at Elmwood Cemetery (Detroit)
Delegates to the 1835 Michigan Constitutional Convention